The Neoutaquet River is a  tributary of the Great Works River in southern Maine. It flows entirely within the town of North Berwick. Via the Great Works and Salmon Falls rivers, it is part of the Piscataqua River watershed, flowing ultimately to the Atlantic Ocean.

See also
List of rivers of Maine

References

Maine Streamflow Data from the USGS
Maine Watershed Data From Environmental Protection Agency

Rivers of Maine
Rivers of York County, Maine